McConnell Family Stadium, formerly Gannon University Field, is a 2,500-seat multi-purpose stadium in Erie, Pennsylvania, United States on the campus of Gannon University.

Overview
The artificial surface field is used by several Gannon University sports teams, including: football, soccer, lacrosse, baseball and softball. Movable stands provide for a maximum seating of 2,500 spectators.

Gannon University Field opened during the spring of 2001. It was renamed McConnell Family Stadium on September 11, 2015, in honor of a donation made by Gannon University Class of 1970 alumnus Dennis McConnell. The Gannon University women's lacrosse team was the first to play on the field.

References

External links
McConnell Family Stadium

Gannon University
College baseball venues in the United States
College football venues
College lacrosse venues in the United States
College soccer venues in the United States
College softball venues in the United States
Multi-purpose stadiums in the United States